David Richard Dyson (born 27 April 1970) is the former Chief Executive of Three UK, one of 4 mobile networks operating in the UK.

Early life
He was born in Bury, Lancashire and is now based in Greater Manchester.

Career
He joined Three (the trading name of Hutchison 3G UK) as Chief Financial Officer in 2006, becoming Chief Operating Officer in 2009.

He became Chief Executive on 1 July 2011, replacing Australian Kevin Russell.

On 5 March 2020 in an email to staff he announced he would be stepping down as CEO of Three UK.  He will be replaced by Three Ireland CEO Robert Finnegan, who will now hold both roles simultaneously.

See also
 :Category:Mobile phone companies of the United Kingdom
 Ronan Dunne, chief executive since 2008 of O2 (United Kingdom)
 Olaf Swantee, chief executive since September 2011 of EE Limited

References

External links
 Three

1970 births
British technology chief executives
British telecommunications industry businesspeople
CK Hutchison Holdings people
English chief executives
People educated at Bury Grammar School
People from Bury, Greater Manchester
Living people